Command Performance is a 2009 American action film starring and directed by Dolph Lundgren, also written with Steve Latshaw. The film co-stars Melissa Smith, Hristo Shopov, Dave Legeno and Lundgren's real life daughter Ida Lundgren in her first feature film debut. The film was released on direct-to-DVD in the United States on November 3, 2009.

The film was premiered at the Ischia Global Film & Music Festival on July 18, 2009. Filming took place between August and September 2008 in Sofia, Bulgaria and Moscow, Russia.

Dolph Lundgren wanted to use his drumming skills on-screen, and the story was inspired by a concert Madonna did for Russian President Vladimir Putin.

Plot

In August 1991, Communist military hard-liners attempted a coup against Soviet President Mikhail Gorbachev. The coup failed, and all its members were arrested; from the ashes of the old Soviet Union, the modern Russian Federation was born.

At the request of Russian president Alexei Petrov, whose daughters Anna and Yana are fans, pop sensation Venus performs a concert in Moscow. The concert turns bloody when armed men led by Oleg Kazov take the concertgoers hostage. It seems that Oleg has a personal vendetta against Petrov. Former biker gang member Joe, the drummer of CMF, the opening rock band, decides to fight the criminals. Back in the US, when Joe was still in the biker gang, Colombian drug dealers wanting to collect a debt went to Joe's apartment and fatally shot his brother. Joe hunted the men down and killed them, and ever since has tried to stay away from guns, because they remind him of his brother's murder.

Most of the civilians and staff, including Venus's manager and brother Enzo, are killed by Oleg's men. The sole survivors are Joe, Venus, news reporter Ali Connor, American ambassador Jim Bradley, Presidential Security Service agent Mikhail Kapista, President Petrov, and his two daughters.

It turns out that Oleg's father was Marshal Dmitri Kazov, a WWII hero in Stalingrad, and former Soviet Minister of Defence, who led the failed coup against Gorbachev in 1991. Oleg was part of the coup as well. After the coup failed, special forces raided the Kazov house; in the chaos, Dmitri killed Oleg's mother and then himself. Oleg, then a captain in the Russian army, immigrated to the United States, where he got arrested for petty crimes, and ended up returning to Russia three weeks prior to the concert. The prosecutor of Marshal Dmitri Kazov, Oleg, and other coup members in 1991 was a young Alexei Petrov, before he became the president of Russia. Oleg thus organised the attack to seek revenge on Petrov, because he blames Petrov for the special forces raid that ended in his parents' deaths; Petrov ordered the raid and followed the troops into the Kazov house.

It is up to Joe and Mikhail make their way through the arena, and bring down Oleg and his men.

Cast

 Dolph Lundgren as Joe Reynolds
 Melissa Smith as Venus
 Hristo Shopov as President Alexei Petrov
 Dave Legeno as Oleg Kazov 
 Clement von Franckenstein as Ambassador Jim Bradley
 James Chalke as Vladimir
 Zahary Baharov as Mikhail Kapista
 Ivaylo Geraskov as Leonid Gordov
 Shelly Varod as Ali Connor
 Katarzyna Wolejnio as Maj. Pavlikova
 Ida Lundgren as Anna Petrova
 Robin Dobson as Yana Petrova
 Raicho Vasilev as Anton
 Slavi Slavov as Capt. Simenov
 Naum Shopov as Peter
 Atanas Srebrev as Enzo
 Vladimir Kolev as Nikolai
 Harry Anichkin as Gen. Voroshilov
 Nikolai Iliev as Aide
 Anna Kulinova as Bartender
 Darin Angelov as Cameraman
 Dejan Kamenov as Vasily
 Rene Shindarov as Young Oleg Kazov
 Nadejda Ivanova as Pretty Woman
 Nikolai Stanoev as Ali's Soundman
 Yulian Vergov as Command Aide
 Krasimir Todorov as D-2 Cmf
 Yavor Alexandrov as D-2 Cmf
 Alexander Obretenov as D-2 Cmf
 Desislav Semerdjiev as D-2 Cmf
 Dimitar Karnev as D-2 Cmf
 Velislav Pavlov as Merc # 1
 Rosen Kovachev as Merc # 2
 Dimo Dimov as Merc # 3
 Tihomir Tenev as Merc # 4
 Lazar Nikolov as Merc # 5
 Goran Ganchev as Merc # 6
 Pasha as Suit # 1
 Mark Coolidge Johnson as Suit # 2
 Les Weldon as Suit # 3
 Ivaylo Spasimirov as Young President Petrov (uncredited)
 Dimiter Doichinov as Terrorist (uncredited)
 Valentin Ganev as Secretary (uncredited)
 Niki Iliev as Aide (uncredited)
 Andrey Kovalev as 'Pilgrim' lead singer (uncredited)
 Kathryn Le as Stage Manager (uncredited)
 Roselbel Rafferr as Rock Girl (uncredited)
 Irson Kudikova as Irson (uncredited)

Music
This movie features the songs "Breakdown" and "Girl" ("6" on the album version) from the band D2, Lost In Love from Melissa Smith, "Ne Gasite Svechu / Keep The Candle Burning" from Andrey Kovalev and "September Rain" from Irson Kudikova.

References

External links
 
 
 
 First Look Studios
 Dolph: The Ultimate Guide

2009 films
2009 direct-to-video films
2009 action films
American films about revenge
American action films
Films about singers
Films about terrorism in Europe
Films directed by Dolph Lundgren
Films set in 1991
Films set in Moscow
Films shot in Bulgaria
Films shot in Moscow
2000s English-language films
2000s American films
Films with screenplays by Dolph Lundgren